Eupithecia irambata is a moth in the  family Geometridae. It is found in India (Sikkim).

References

Moths described in 1893
irambata
Moths of Asia